José Canalejas y Casas (1827–1902) was a Spanish engineer, writer and politician.

Biography 
Born in December 1827 in Barcelona. He was son of José María Canalejas Ugalde and Ana María Casas Foxet.

He took studies in industrial engineering in Liège. Canalejas, who worked for the Railway Company from Ciudad Real to Badajoz, came to replace Telesforo Gómez Rodríguez as member of the Congress of Deputies, elected in representation of the Arévalo district at 1876 election to Cortes, who had renounced to the seat, as it was incompatible with his occupation as land registrar.

He became deputy again in 1881, this time in representation of Borjas, replacing Manuel Vivanco Menchaca, elected at the 1879 election, who had renounced to office in January 1881. Canalejas  became Senator in representation of the province of Ávila in 1891.

He died in Madrid in November 1902.

José Canalejas Casas was father José Canalejas Méndez, prime minister of Spain durante the reign of Alfonso XIII  and of Luis Canalejas Méndez, politician and engineer.

Works 

 Anuario de los progresos de la industria y la agricultura (1861)

References 
Informational notes

Citations

Bibliography
 
 
 

Spanish engineers
Members of the Congress of Deputies of the Spanish Restoration
Members of the Senate of Spain
1827 births
1902 deaths